Wanglam Sawin is an Indian politician from the state of Arunachal Pradesh.

Sawin was elected  from Khonsa East seat in the 2014 Arunachal Pradesh Legislative Assembly election, standing as a People's Party of Arunachal candidate. He is a retired teacher.

He resigned from the post of MLA on 20 September 2016.

See also
Arunachal Pradesh Legislative Assembly

References

External links
Wanglam Sawin profile
MyNeta Profile
Janpratinidhi Profile 

Indian National Congress politicians
Living people
Arunachal Pradesh MLAs 2014–2019
People's Party of Arunachal politicians
Bharatiya Janata Party politicians from Arunachal Pradesh
Year of birth missing (living people)